Sukhda Misra (born 15 October 1941) is a political and social worker and a Member of Parliament elected from the  Etawah constituency in the Indian  state of Uttar Pradesh in 1998 as a Bharatiya Janata Party candidate. In 2009 general elections she contested from Kanpur on Bahujan Samaj Party ticket, but she lost with margin of 1,66,614 against Shriprakash Jaiswal.

Education & Career
Sukhda completed her B.A in Chandigarh.
She was elected as a Member of the Uttar Pradesh Legislative Assembly during 1974-77 and 1980–91. She was elected to the 12th Lok Sabha in 1998 and during 1998–99, she served as
Member on the Committee on Energy and its Sub-Committee-I on Power
Member on Joint Committee on the Empowerment of Women and its Sub-Committee on Education and Health Programmes for Women
Member, Consultative Committee, Ministry of Civil Aviation
Special Invitee, Consultative Committee, Ministry of Surface Transport

References

India MPs 1998–1999
Women in Uttar Pradesh politics
1941 births
Living people
People from Etawah district
Uttar Pradesh MLAs 1974–1977
Uttar Pradesh MLAs 1980–1985
Uttar Pradesh MLAs 1985–1989
Uttar Pradesh MLAs 1989–1991
Articles created or expanded during Women's History Month (India) - 2014
20th-century Indian women politicians
20th-century Indian politicians
Bahujan Samaj Party politicians from Uttar Pradesh
Bharatiya Janata Party politicians from Uttar Pradesh